

The Blume Bl.500, Bl.502, and Bl.503 were a family of four-seat light aircraft designed in West Germany by Dr Walter Blume in the late 1950s.

Design and development
Derived from his Arado Ar 79, the basic design shared by all models was that of a conventional low-wing cantilever monoplane with retractable tricycle undercarriage and all-metal construction. The Bl.500 prototype was built for Blume at the Focke-Wulf plant and was powered by a Lycoming O-320 engine of 112 kW (150 hp). This led to a modified version, the Bl.502 that achieved German type certification and was offered for sale alongside the generally similar Bl.503 with a more powerful engine.  However, no orders were forthcoming and Blume abandoned the project.

Operational history
The final example of the design, the Blume Bl.503 was still active in 1965.

Variants
Bl.500
prototype
Bl.502
intended production version with Lycoming O-320
Bl.503
proposed production version with Lycoming O-360. A single example was completed.

Specifications (Bl.502)

See also

References

 
 
 

Bl502
Single-engined tractor aircraft
Low-wing aircraft
1950s German civil utility aircraft
Aircraft first flown in 1957